Peringad is a village near to puvathur Town in thrissur District, Kerala, India.

Chithara Estate
The famous oil palm "Chithara Estate" is here.

References

Villages in Kollam district